The Ferracute Machine Company was founded by inventor Oberlin Smith in Bridgeton, New Jersey in 1863.  Oberlin was an American engineer who was first noted for his work in magnetic recording.  Oberlin Smith's ideas in magnetic recording were used by Valdemar Poulsen when he developed magnetic recording successfully.

History
Ferracute Machine Company initially started out as a machine shop but it eventually went on to produce metal forming presses.  Early presses were manufactured to make tin cans but eventually the larger Ferracute presses were used extensively to produce automobile parts for Cadillac, Packard, Pierce, Chrysler, Ford and others.  In 1910 Ferracute produced 39 presses for Ford's Highland Park plant. Ford Motor Company eventually purchased almost 500 Ferracute presses between 1914-1917 for the war effort.  Ferracute produced presses for Baldwin Locomotive Works, General Electric as well as for munitions plants in England and Canada.

Under Oberlin Smith's direction, Ferracute Machine Company was progressive and he was always looking for the cutting edge applications for his presses. He traveled to Europe often to seek opportunities. With this goal in mind he produced presses to mint coins; one of his customers was the U.S. Mint. In 1897, engineer Henry A. Janvier went to China to install three presses in the Imperial Chinese mint.  In 1909, Ferracute installed the first electric presses in La Casa de Moneda (the mint) of Potosi, Bolivia - one of the oldest and largest mints of the Americas, first established during the Spanish colonial period in 1572.

Sale
In 1937 Ferracute was sold to George E. Bass. With the advent of the Second World War Ferracute once again became a major supplier of machine tools, in the form of presses, to build munitions, aircraft components, and other war material. During World War II, Frankford Arsenal became Ferracute's biggest customer. The governments of Britain and the Soviet Union turned to Ferracute for presses to help them in their domestic war production efforts.

Closure
After the war the business went into general decline until the company was finally closed in 1968. The factory headquarters caught fire on March 2, 2020, at 12:30 in the morning and burned down. The remains of the buildings were subsequently demolished.

References

External links 
 Oberlin Smith Biography http://www.ieeeghn.org/wiki/index.php/Oberlin_Smith
 Canning in Nineteenth Century Delaware http://www.deldot.gov/archaeology/collins_geddes/pdf/collins_geddes_3.pdf
 Imperial Chinese Mint 1898 in the Hagley Digital Archives
 Casa de Moneda, Potosi Bolivia  http://www.casanacionaldemoneda.org.bo/
 New Jersey Historic Trust http://www.state.nj.us/dca/njht/funded/sitedetails/ferracute_machine_company.html
 Preservation New Jersey http://www.preservationnj.org/site/ExpEng/index.php?/ten_most/archive_by_name_detail/2000/Ferracute_Machine_Company
 New Jersey Pines and Down History https://web.archive.org/web/20110714185610/http://www.njpinelandsanddownjersey.com/open/index.php?module=documents&JAS_DocumentManager_op=viewDocument&JAS_Document_id=64
 Ferracute Machine Company records at Hagley Museum and Library

Companies based in Cumberland County, New Jersey
Bridgeton, New Jersey